Two Kinds of Laughter is an album by the American singer-songwriter Sara Hickman, released in 1998.

Critical reception
The Chicago Tribune thought that "Belew generally stays out of the way of Hickman's breezy, congenial folk-pop, keeping the focus on her achingly earnest lyrics and lithe, undemanding melodies."

AllMusic wrote that "Hickman creates an inviting tension in her songs, pitting unusual lyric lines against catchy melodies."

Track listing
"Two Kinds of Laughter" (Hickman) – 4:30
"Take Whatever I Can Get" (Goldsen, Hickman) – 5:13
"I Wear the Crown" (Hickman, Trevisick) – 4:30
"Coolness by Mistake" (Brion, Hickman) – 3:30
"Eight" (Hickman) – 4:30
"Secret Family" (?, Hickman) – 3:26
"Look at It This Way" (Boyd, Hickman) – 3:40
"Optimistic Fool" (Hickman, Jacobsen) – 5:34
"One in Our Happiness" (Hickman, Lester) – 4:29
"E Cosi Desio Me Mena" (Hickman, Lester) – 2:46
"Comets over Costa Rica" (Hickman, Trevisick) – 5:47
"Let Go" (Tiven) – 3:25

References 

Sara Hickman albums
1998 albums